Carl A. Singleton (December 16, 1903 – February 9, 1974) was an American politician. He served as a Democratic member for the 103rd, 109th and 111th district of the Florida House of Representatives.

Singleton was born in Indianapolis, Indiana, and had two brothers and a sister. He moved to Florida in 1939. Singleton worked in a liquor store which he had established. He had worked as a business executive.

Singleton died in February 1974 of cancer at his home in Coral Gables, Florida, at the age of 70.

References 

1903 births
1974 deaths
Politicians from Indianapolis
Democratic Party members of the Florida House of Representatives
20th-century American politicians
American business executives
Deaths from cancer in Florida